Discrimination based on hair texture, also known as texturism, is a form of social injustice, found worldwide. Afro-textured hair has frequently been seen as being "unprofessional", "unattractive", and "unclean". 

Texturism, like colorism and racism, is a system. Texturism and colorism are by products of racism, and in a sense, cousins, in how closely they are related. Being prejudicial or discriminatory towards a coarser hair type is ignorance, not a preference. Those with coarser hair types may sometimes be stereotyped as unprofessional upon wearing their hair out, while looser textures are seen as more appropriate and feminine. These practices are why laws such as the Crown act have been passed and are necessary to ensure those with typically Afrocentric, coarser hair types are represented and not solely being discriminated for what is on  their head.

History
In the Western world, afro-textured hair has historically been treated with disdain, by members of all ethnicities. In the 15th and 16th centuries, the Atlantic slave trade saw Black Africans forcibly transported from Sub-Saharan Africa to North America and, upon their arrival in the New World, their heads would be shaved in effort to erase their culture, as many Africans used hairstyles to signify their tribal identity, marital status, age, and other personal characteristics. Early on, both men and women would wear headscarves in order to protect their scalps from sunburn and lice but, as time progressed, these hair wraps became more associated with women, who began to wear them in various fashions, based on their region and personal style. In the 19th century, when enslaved men and women were no longer being brought from Africa, quality of life increased for them somewhat as they became more valuable in their owners' eyes. Now enjoying Sundays off, Black women would take the day to style their hair, uncovering it for church services but keeping it wrapped Monday through Saturday. As traditional styling tools were not available to them, Black women began to use butter, kerosene, and bacon grease and combs meant for livestock to style their hair.

The concept of "good hair" arose in the time leading up to the abolition of slavery in the United States. Enslaved people who worked in the home did not wear headscarves as field laborers did and, as they were often children of a White man in the family that owned them. To straighten their hair, Black women would often use a mixture of lye, which could burn their skin. In New Orleans, Louisiana, in the 18th century, Black and Louisiana Creole women were required by law to wear a tignon, to cover their hair, and, in an act of resistance, did so but adorned their wraps with fine fabrics and jewelry.

Madam C. J. Walker, an African American businesswoman, achieved great fortune and recognition for widening the teeth of the hot comb, which would straighten afro-textured hair.

Discrimination by country

Canada 
Similar to many countries around the world, black and First Nations Canadians have experienced discrimination in educational and professional environments. One type of discrimination has been based on their hair textures and styles. The cause of this type of discrimination is based on long standing Eurocentric views of beauty that were established during early colonization. Setting this standard was used as a tool to suppress both African and First nations culture. Though Canada has made a commitment to support anti-racism and reconciliation there has been no specific protections put in place (such as the United States CROWN Act) to protect against this form of discrimination.

In Canada, there has been notable cases of discrimination that made national news sites about Black Canadian women being discriminated against at their work place, due to their hair being deemed unprofessional. In 2016, a Bi-racial woman in Scarborough, Ontario, who was working at the retail chain ZARA, was asked to remove her box braids because her hair style was considered unprofessional. In another case, an African-American woman living in Montreal, Quebec, was sent home from a restaurant and denied shifts, because her hair was in cornrows. The woman gained representation through the Centre for Research Action on Race Relations (CRARR), and filed a case with the Quebec Human Rights Commission based racial and gender discrimination. She won her case and was awarded $14,500 in damages.

First Nations people in Canada have also experienced discrimination and harm due to wearing hair styles that do not conform to Eurocentric view. During the time of residential schools, First Nations children braids were cut from their heads to force assimilation. Similar incidents have happened recently in Canada. In 2009, in Thunder Bay, Ontario, a First Nations boy’s hair was cut by a teachers aide. In 2018, a boy in Calgary, Alberta came from school with his hair cut after another student bullied him and then cut out his braid. Braids hold significant ties to the past before colonization and have important culture meaning.

Dominican Republic
In the Dominican Republic, hair is seen as an important attribute of physical beauty. Many view straight hair as beautiful and appropriate for a professional setting while also seeing afro-textured hair as inappropriate and distracting. This mindset had stemmed from racial discrimination. This has changed over the years in the United States and abroad as the American Natural Hair Movement gains popularity.

In the Dominican Republic, hair straightening is done for the same reasons it is done in the United States and the diaspora for convenience and to conform to western beauty standards. In 1996 Rooks affirmed "Hair in 1976 spoke to racial identity politics as well as bonding between African American women. Its style could lead to acceptance or rejection from certain groups and social classes, and its styling could provide the possibility of a career".

Straightened and more conservative styles are still the standard in the workplace, as it is in the United States and other countries with African descendants of the diaspora. The views expressed aren't exclusive to the Dominican Republic. Contrary to popular misconception many Dominican women do wear natural hair and it is becoming increasingly accepted in society.

Jamaica 
In 2018, a five-year-old girl was banned from attending classes at her primary school in Kingston, Jamaica, for having dreadlocks.

Somalia 
During the Arab slave trade, many Bantus were captured in Tanzania and brought to work as slaves in Somalia. The Bantus are phenotypically, linguistically and culturally distinct from the ethnic Somalis of Somalia and were discriminated based on this and still are to this day. The Bantus brought there, who are now called Somali Bantus, were called "Jareer" by the ethnic Somalis which is derogatory word meaning kinky-haired.

United States

See also 
 Beard and haircut laws by country
 Black is Beautiful
 Blonde stereotype
 Blonde versus brunette rivalry
 Colorism
 Discrimination against people with red hair
 Good hair (phrase)
Hair Love
 Internalized racism
 List of hairstyles
 Paper bag party
 Prejudice and discrimination against redheads

References

Bibliography
"Black Women and Identity: What's Hair Got To Do With It?" vol. 22, no. 1, fall 2008–2009
"Dreadlock Discrimination: Is There Such A Thing?" AOL Jobs. N.p., n.d. Web. 29 Apr. 2013.
""Dreadlock Discrimination" Triggers Lawsuit." Racial Discrimination Based On A Hairstyle? N.p., n.d. Web. 30 Apr. 2013.
"For African-American Women, a Hairstyle Can Be a Tricky Decision." SaportaReport. N.p., n.d. Web. 29 Apr. 2013.
"Good Hair (film)." Wikipedia. Wikimedia Foundation, 28 Apr. 2013. Web. 30 Apr. 2013.
"Willis Mason. History of the American People. Boston: Allyn and Bacon, 1922. Print.

Anti-black racism
Anti-indigenous racism
Hair
Human hair